Cleora inoffensa is a moth of the family Geometridae first described by Charles Swinhoe in 1902. It is found in the Himalayas, Sundaland, the Philippines, Sulawesi and on the Solomons.

References

External links

Cleora
Moths described in 1902
Moths of Asia